Blue Gum Park may refer to:

Blue Gum Park, Adelaide Park Lands, South Australia
Blue Gum Park, Irvine, California